Navis actuaria (plural: naves actuariae) was a type of transport ship used by the Roman navy.

The ship had sails and up to 30 oars (15 on each side). They were short, narrow at bow and stern and wider midships. They were one of the fastest ships and they were very easy to maneuver. They had a flat hull, so that they could run aground without being damaged. Furthermore, the navis actuaria could go ashore both forwards and backwards, since it was equipped with rudders fore and aft. The ship could run aground on a beach, unload, and depart without damage. When they took damage they did not sink into the water. The ship was therefore suitable for the transport of supplies and horses.

The ship's draft was low (about ). Most of the naves actuariae were not armed.
However, ships that were used in 16 CE under general Germanicus, carried light weaponry.

The navis actuaria should not be confused with the navis lusoria, which was a small patrol boat used in Late Antiquity.

References

Emil Luebeck : Actuariae . In: Pauly Real encyclopedia of classical archeology (RE). Volume I, 1, Stuttgart 1893, Sp. 331st
Hans DL Viereck: The Roman fleet. Classis romana. Nikol, Hamburg 1996 (Herford 1975), .

Navy of ancient Rome
Ancient Roman ships